A foreword is a (usually short) piece of writing, sometimes placed at the beginning of a book or other piece of literature.  Typically written by someone other than the primary author of the work, it often tells of some interaction between the writer of the foreword and the book's primary author or the story the book tells.  Later editions of a book sometimes have a new foreword prepended (appearing before an older foreword if there was one), which might explain in what respects that edition differs from previous ones.

When written by the author, the foreword may cover the story of how the book came into being or how the idea for the book was developed, and may include thanks and acknowledgments to people who were helpful to the author during the time of writing. Unlike a preface, a foreword is always signed.

Information essential to the main text is generally placed in a set of explanatory notes, or perhaps in an introduction, rather than in the foreword or like preface.

The pages containing the foreword and preface (and other front matter) are typically not numbered as part of the main work, which usually uses Arabic numerals.  If the front matter is paginated, it uses lowercase Roman numerals.  If there is both a foreword and a preface, the foreword appears first; both appear before the introduction, which may be paginated either with the front matter or the main text.

The word foreword was first used around the mid-17th century, originally as a term in philology. It was possibly a calque of German Vorwort, itself a calque of Latin praefatio.

See also

 Afterword
 Epigraph
 Introduction
 Preface
 Prologue

References

External links

 The difference between a preface, foreword, and introduction – PatMcNees.com

Book design
Book terminology
Literature